The Personnel Rescue is a combat search and rescue and advanced air controller unit affiliated to the Turkish Air Force whose task is to recover pilots and other military personnel stranded behind enemy lines and qualified service member who directs the action of combat aircraft engaged in close air support and other offensive air operations from a forward position. It is similar to the United States Air Force Pararescue unit. They receive 53 weeks of training.

Equipment

References 

Special forces of Turkey
Special forces